Sino-Vietnamese vocabulary (Chữ Hán: 詞漢越, literally 'Chinese-Vietnamese words') is a layer of some 3,000 monosyllabic morphemes of the Vietnamese language borrowed from Literary Chinese with consistent pronunciations based on "Annamese" Middle Chinese. Compounds using these morphemes are used extensively in cultural and technical vocabulary. Together with Sino-Korean and Sino-Japanese vocabularies, Sino-Vietnamese has been used in the reconstruction of the sound categories of Middle Chinese.
Samuel Martin grouped the three together as "Sino-xenic".
There is also an Old Sino-Vietnamese layer consisting of a few hundred words borrowed individually from Chinese in earlier periods. These words are treated by speakers as native.
More recent loans from southern varieties of Chinese, usually names of foodstuffs such as  'Chinese sausage', are not treated as Sino-Vietnamese.

Estimates of the proportion of words of Chinese origin in the Vietnamese lexicon vary from one third to half and even to 70%.
The proportion tends towards the lower end in speech and towards the higher end in technical writing.
In the famous  dictionary by Vietnamese linguist , about 40% percent of vocabulary are of Chinese origin.

Monosyllabic loanwords 

As a result of a thousand years of Chinese control (except for brief rebellions), and a further thousand years of use of Literary Chinese after independence, two main layers of Chinese vocabulary have been borrowed into Vietnamese. These layers were first systematically studied by linguist Wang Li.

Middle Chinese and Vietnamese, like most languages of the Mainland Southeast Asia linguistic area, are analytic languages. Almost all morphemes are monosyllabic and lacking inflection.
The phonological structure of their syllables is also similar.

The Old Sino-Vietnamese layer was introduced after the Chinese conquest of the kingdom of Nanyue, including the northern part of Vietnam, in 111 BC. The influence of the Chinese language was particularly felt during the Eastern Han period (25–190 AD), due to increased Chinese immigration and official efforts to sinicize the territory.
This layer consists of roughly 400 words, which have been fully assimilated and are treated by Vietnamese speakers as native words.

The much more extensive Sino-Vietnamese proper was introduced with Chinese rhyme dictionaries such as the Qieyun in the late Tang dynasty (618–907).
Vietnamese scholars used a systematic rendering of Middle Chinese within the phonology of Vietnamese to derive consistent pronunciations for the entire Chinese lexicon.
After driving out the Chinese in 880, the Vietnamese sought to build a state on the Chinese model, including using Literary Chinese for all formal writing, including administration and scholarship, until the early 20th century.
Around 3,000 words entered Vietnamese over this period.
Some of these were re-introductions of words borrowed at the Old Sino-Vietnamese stage, with different pronunciations due to intervening sound changes in Vietnamese and Chinese, and often with a shift in meaning.

Wang Li followed Henri Maspero in identifying a problematic group of forms with "softened" initials g-, gi, d- and v- as Sino-Vietnamese loans that had been affected by changes in colloquial Vietnamese.
Most scholars now follow André-Georges Haudricourt in assigning these words to the Old Sino-Vietnamese layer.

Sino-Vietnamese shows a number of distinctive developments from Middle Chinese:
 Sino-Vietnamese distinguishes Early Middle Chinese palatal and retroflex sibilants, which are identified in all modern Chinese varieties, and had already merged by the Late Middle Chinese period.
 Sino-Vietnamese reflects Late Middle Chinese labiodental initials, which were not distinguished from labial stops at the Early Middle Chinese phase.
 Middle Chinese grade II finals yield a palatal medial -y- like northern Chinese varieties but unlike southern ones. For example, Middle Chinese  kæw yields SV , Cantonese gaau and Beijing .

Modern compounds 
Up until the early 20th century, Literary Chinese was the vehicle of administration and scholarship, not only in China, but also in Vietnam, Korea and Japan, similar to Latin in medieval Europe.
Though not a spoken language, this shared written language was read aloud in different places according to local traditions derived from Middle Chinese pronunciation: the literary readings in various parts of China and Sino-Xenic pronunciations in the other countries.

As contact with the West grew, Western works were translated into Literary Chinese and read by the literate. In order to translate words for new concepts (political, religious, scientific, medical and technical terminology) scholars in these countries coined new compounds formed from Chinese morphemes and written with Chinese characters.  The local readings of these compounds were readily adopted into the respective local vernaculars of Japan, Korea and Vietnam.
For example, the Chinese mathematician Li Shanlan created hundreds of translations of mathematical terms, including  ('replace-number-study') for 'algebra', yielding modern Chinese dàishùxué, Vietnamese đại số học, Japanese daisūgaku and Korean daesuhak. Often, multiple compounds for the same concept were in circulation for some time before a winner emerged, with the final choice sometimes differing between countries.

A fairly large amount of Sino-Vietnamese compounds have meanings that differ significantly from their usage in other Sinitic vocabularies. For example:
bác sĩ is widely used with the meaning 'physician' or 'medical doctor', while in Chinese it refers to a doctoral degree;
tiến sĩ (進士) is used to refer to 'doctoral degree', whilst in Chinese it is used to refer to 'successful candidate in the highest imperial civil service examination'. 
bạc  'silver' is the Old Sino-Vietnamese reflex of Old Chinese *bra:g  'white', cognate with later Sino-Vietnamese bạch 'white', yet in Chinese  means 'thin sheet of metal' (variants:) and 鉑 (pinyin: bó) has also acquired the meaning 'platinum', whose Sino-Vietnamese name is  bạch kim, literally 'white gold'; 
luyện kim means 'metallurgy' instead of its original meaning, 'alchemy'; 
giáo sư means 'teacher' in Chinese, but is now associated with 'professor' in Vietnamese. 
English "club" became  kurabu in Japan, was borrowed to China, then to Vietnam, is read as câu lạc bộ, and abbreviated CLB, which can be an abbreviation for club.
linh miêu means 'civet' in Chinese but means 'lynx' in Vietnamese.
ân nghĩa ~  ơn nghĩa not only retains its original Chinese meaning "feeling of gratitude" but also acquires the extended meaning "favor, kindness".

Some Sino-Vietnamese compounds are entirely invented by the Vietnamese and are not used in Chinese, such as linh mục 'pastor' from  'soul' and  'shepherd', or giả kim thuật ( 'art of artificial metal'), which has been applied popularly to refer to 'alchemy'. Another example is linh cẩu ('alert dog') meaning 'hyena'. Others are no longer used in modern Chinese or have other meanings.

More examples include trang trại (莊寨, 'farm'), thành phố (城庯, 'city'), hiện diện (現面, 'to be present at'), giải trí (解智, 'to entertain'), ngoạn mục (玩目, 'pleasant to the eyes'), cổ truyền (古傳, 'traditional'), thoả mãn (妥滿, 'to satisfy'), nhiệt kế (熱計, 'thernometer'), đăng quang (登光, 'to be crowned/enthroned'), and hệ quả (係果, 'consequence/corrolary').

Proper names 

Since Sino-Vietnamese provides a Vietnamese form for almost all Chinese characters, it can be used to derive a Vietnamese form for any Chinese word or name. For example, the name of Chinese leader Xi Jinping consists of the Chinese characters . Applying Sino-Vietnamese reading to each character yields the Vietnamese translation of his name, Tập Cận Bình.

Some Western names and words, approximated in Chinese or in some cases approximated in Japanese and then borrowed into Chinese, were further approximated in Vietnamese. For example, Portugal is transliterated as Putaoya  in Chinese, became Bồ Đào Nha in Vietnamese. England (Chinese: Ying-ge-lan) became Anh Cát Lợi, shortened to Anh, while United States became Mỹ Lợi Gia, shortened to Mỹ. The formal name for the United States in Vietnamese is Hoa Kỳ; this is a former Chinese name of the United States and translates literally as "flower flag".

Except for the oldest and most deeply ingrained Sino-Vietnamese names, modern Vietnamese instead uses direct phonetic transliterations for foreign names, in order to preserve the original spelling and pronunciation. Today, the written form of such transliterated names are almost always left unaltered; with rising levels of proficiency in English spelling and pronunciation in Vietnam, readers generally no longer need to be instructed on the correct pronunciation for common foreign names. For example, while the Sino-Vietnamese  remains in common usage in Vietnamese, the English equivalent London is also commonplace. Calques have also arisen to replace some Sino-Vietnamese terms.

However, China-specific names such as Trung Quốc (Middle Kingdom), as well as Korean names with Chinese roots, continue to be rendered in Sino-Vietnamese rather than the romanization systems used in other languages. Examples include Triều Tiên (Joseon) for both Korea as a whole and North Korea in particular, Hàn Quốc (Hanguk) for South Korea, Bình Nhưỡng (Pyongyang), and Bàn Môn Điếm (Panmunjom). Seoul, unlike most Korean place names, has no corresponding hanja; it is therefore phonetically transliterated as Xê-un.

Usage 

Sino-Vietnamese words have a status similar to that of Latin-based words in English: they are used more in formal context than in everyday life.  Because Chinese and Vietnamese use different order for subject and modifier, compound Sino-Vietnamese words or phrases might appear ungrammatical in Vietnamese sentences.  For example, the Sino-Vietnamese phrase bạch mã ( "white horse") can be expressed in Vietnamese as ngựa trắng ("horse white").  For this reason, compound words containing native Vietnamese and Sino-Vietnamese words are very rare and are considered improper by some. For example, chung cư ("apartment building") was originally derived from chúng cư  ("multiple dwelling"), but with the syllable chúng "multiple" replaced with chung, a "pure" Vietnamese word meaning "shared" or "together".  Similarly, the literal translation of "United States", Hợp chúng quốc is commonly mistakenly rendered as Hợp chủng quốc, with chúng ( - many) replaced by chủng ( - ethnicity, race). Another example is tiệt diện ("cross-section") being replaced by tiết diện.

One interesting example is the current motto of Vietnam "Cộng hòa Xã hội chủ nghĩa Việt Nam / Độc lập – Tự do – Hạnh phúc", all the words are Sino-Vietnamese.  

Writing Sino-Vietnamese words with the Vietnamese alphabet causes some confusion about the origins of some terms, due to the large number of homophones in Chinese and Sino-Vietnamese. Perhaps for this reason, the Vietnamese name for Pluto is not Minh Vương Tinh ( – lit. "underworld king star") as in other East Asian languages, but is Diêm Vương Tinh and sao Diêm Vương, named after the Hindu and Buddhist deity Yama. During the Hồ dynasty, Vietnam was officially known as Đại Ngu ( "Great Peace"). However, most modern Vietnamese know ngu as "stupid"; consequently, some misinterpret it as "Big Idiot". Conversely, the Han River in South Korea is often erroneously translated as sông Hàn when it should be sông Hán due to the name's similarity with the country name. However, the homograph/homophone problem is not as serious as it appears, because although many Sino-Vietnamese words have multiple meanings when written with the Vietnamese alphabet, usually only one has widespread usage, while the others are relegated to obscurity. Furthermore, Sino-Vietnamese words are usually not used alone, but in compound words, thus the meaning of the compound word is preserved even if individually each has multiple meanings. 

Today Sino-Vietnamese texts are learnt and used mostly only by Buddhist monks since important texts such as the scriptures to pacify spirits (recited during the ritual for the Seventh Lunar month - Trai Đàn Chẩn Tế) are still recited in Sino-Vietnamese pronunciations. Such as the chant, Nam mô A Di Đà Phật coming from 南無阿彌陀佛.

See also 
 Chữ Nôm (historical writing system modelled on Chinese characters)
 History of writing in Vietnam
Stratum (linguistics)

References

Citations

Sources

Further reading 
 
Chiang Chia-lu (江佳璐). (2014). 析論越南漢字音魚虞分韻的歷史層次 [Discussion on the Phonological Strata of Sino-Vietnamese as Reflected in the Distinction between Rhymes Yu (魚) and Yu (虞)]. Language and Linguistics, 15(5), 613-634.
Chiang Chia-lu (江佳璐). (2018). 《安南國譯語》所反映的近代漢語聲調系統 [The Tonal System of Early Mandarin Chinese as Reflected in Annanguo Yiyu]. 漢學研究, 36(2), 97-126.
Nguyen Thanh-Tung (阮青松). (2015). 漢越語和漢語的層次對應關係研究 [A study of the stratal corresponding relationship between Sino-Vietnamese and Chinese] (Master's thesis). National Chung Hsing University, Taiwan.
Phan, John D. (2010). Re-Imagining “Annam”: A New Analysis of Sino–Viet–Muong Linguistic Contact. 南方華裔研究雑志 [Chinese Southern Diaspora Studies], 4, 3-24.

External links 
 Đào Duy Anh (1932), Hán Việt Từ Điển – a dictionary of Sino-Vietnamese words and expressions (in Vietnamese). volume 1 (A–M).
Miyake, Marc: Umbrous umbrella (2014); Sino-Vietnamese articles (2014); Sino-Vietnamese articles 1, 2 (2013); Sino-Vietnamese articles (2012); t for *p in Vietnamese (2012); Cantonese and Sino-Vietnamese (2010); Sino-Vietnamese articles (2010); From *m to z in Old Chinese and Vietnamese (2008).

Vietnamese language
Vietnamese